Wiesław Ksawery Rudkowski (17 November 1946 – 14 February 2016) was a Polish boxer and Olympic silver medalist.  He lost the gold medal match to Dieter Kottysch.

References
 Olympic Results

1946 births
2016 deaths
Olympic boxers of Poland
Boxers at the 1968 Summer Olympics
Boxers at the 1972 Summer Olympics
Olympic silver medalists for Poland
Sportspeople from Łódź
Olympic medalists in boxing
Polish male boxers
Medalists at the 1972 Summer Olympics
Light-middleweight boxers